Huining may refer to:

Huining County (会宁县), county in Gansu, China
Huining Prefecture (會寧府), former prefecture in the Shangjing region of Manchuria, location of the early capital of the Jin (Jurchen) Dynasty
Halang, Ukhrul, or Huining, a village in Manipur, India
Luo Huining (born 1954), Chinese politician and senior regional official